Goginan is a small village in Ceredigion, about 7 miles outside Aberystwyth on the A44 between Ponterwyd and Capel Bangor. The Afon Melindwr runs through the village, and is a tributary of the Afon Rheidol.

The village originally grew around farms in the area, but increased with the development of local mines.

To the east of the villages lies a Grade II Listed 19th century house thought to be associated with the lead mines in the area; it is probably the Goginan mine manager's house. Cadw Building ID: 9857.

Famous people from the village
 William Ambrose Bebb. Author
 Humphrey Owen Jones
 Owen Prys

References 

Villages in Ceredigion